Jorge Imaz (born 25 November 1950) is an Argentine rower. He competed in the men's double sculls event at the 1972 Summer Olympics.

References

1950 births
Living people
Argentine male rowers
Olympic rowers of Argentina
Rowers at the 1972 Summer Olympics
Place of birth missing (living people)